Marakwet is also a district in Kenya, see Marakwet District
The Marakwet are one of the groups forming the ethnolinguistic Kalenjin community of Kenya, they speak the Markweta language. The Marakwet live in five territorial sections namely Almoo, Cherangany (Sengwer or Kimaala), Endoow, Sombirir (Borokot) and Markweta (the dialect giving rise to the common name). Cutting across these territorial groups are a number of clans to which each Marakwet belongs. There were 119,969 Marakwet people in 2019.

Most Marakwet today live in the Elgeyo-Marakwet County, a notably beautiful and picturesque part of Kenya. It is bounded to the east by the Kerio River at 1000 m above sea level, which runs through a small branch of the Great Rift Valley. To the west it includes almost the entire Cherang’any hills which rise to 3300 m above sea level west of the Marakwet escarpment. Significant populations of individuals of Marakwet heritage are also resident in the Trans Nzoia, and Uasin Gishu counties, as well as in other towns in Kenya. Others have moved to live in places as far away as Australia, Southern Africa, the Middle East, and United States.

A large majority of Marakwet lead a simple rural life characterized by mixed small scale farming. They grow mostly maize, potatoes, beans and vegetables in the highlands. Those who live along the escarpment and the Kerio Valley mainly keep goats and zebu cows. They also grow millet, sorghum, cassava, vegetables and fruits, mostly mangoes and oranges. There is a sophisticated pre-historic irrigation furrow system that supports this crop cultivation along the Kerio Valley that is thought to be over 500 years old. Some of the greatest long distance and especially steeplechase runners in the world have come from amongst these people. A notable example is Moses Kiptanui, the first man to run a sub-eight in steeplechase.

History
The traditional Marakwet religion consisted of multiple deities with hierarchical ranking. The most important deity was Assis (the sun), sometimes fondly referred to as Chebetip chemataw. He is mostly associated with blessings and good will. Another deity is Ilat (god of thunder). He is associated with rain and in dry seasons sacrifices were made to appease him. He is also associated with fury and vengeance whereby he causes droughts or strikes people with lightning if he is angered.

19th century
It is not immediately clear when a distinct Marakwet identity took form. Through to the early 20th century, the various Marakwet territorial groups were referred to by their individual names. Beech (1911) for instance did a study of the Endo, who he noted among the neighbors of the Suk.

Culture
Traditional Marakwet society shared a number of similarities but also distinct peculiarities, with and from other Kalenjin communities.

Social groups
The Marakwet people consist of five distinct territorial groups that, "forged some form of association through their common residence along the Kerio Valley and the Cherangani Hills". From north to south along the valley are, the Endoow, Markweta and Almoo, in the hills are, the Borokot and Cherang'any (Sengwer or Kimaala).

Cutting across the territorial groups are thirteen patrilineal clans, each of which (with the exception of Sogom) is divided into two or more exogamic sections distinguished by totems. Many of these clans are also represented in other Kalenjin groups.

Each person recognizes, as the primary part of his/her personal name, the name of their clan. For instance a man of the Kobil clan, asked, "Who are you?", would reply "I am Kobilyo", a woman of the same clan, "I am Kobilyo". Next they would be asked, "Of which totem?" and only after this primary identification can more personal names be given.

Folklore
Like other oral societies, the Marakwet developed a rich collection of folklore. Folk narratives were told to pass on a message and also as a means of keeping historical record. A common Marakwet folk tale is the Legend of fall of Kipteber, the rock-mountain.

Relations with the Pokot people
The Marakwet and Pokot tribes are both sub-groups of the larger Kalenjin. War started as a result of livestock theft, and the tribes have since gone through periods of war and peace. War raged between some of the Marakwet clans, e.g. Kapkau and Karel from the valley, because of a land dispute and this has resulted in a loss of lives (11 people were killed in Kapkau). There was a demonstration by people of the Sambirir region over alleged killing of people and they requested the government to carry out an operation in the lower part to remove all guns, but this has not been done. The district court promised to act in order to make Marakwet a peaceful place.
Note: The Killings done by the Karel people were attributed to high handedness, arrogance and fraud on the part of the region's leadership. It's understood that land is an emotive issue and killings may continue, unless the oppressors stop grabbing land from their rightful owners. Kerbut land is known to belong to Karel... and until when they are given their rightful land, they are most likely to continue killing.

There have been immense achievements in terms of peace promotion among the Marakwets and the Pokots. War between them ended in the year 2000, marked by the killing of 47 people in Murkutwa Marakwet, 26 km east of Chesoi. The Marakwets and the Pokots coexist now and conduct trade, for example in the Kipchinda, Chesongoch, Kolowo and Tot markets. Marakwets also take cereals [maize, millet and sorghum] to the Pokots in the Kolowo and Kimnai markets in exchange for cash.

Notable people
Edward Cheserek, a Kenyan-American runner
Edwin Kemboi Sutter, a pioneer ICT specialist, accomplished public servant and the current Chief Officer for ICT & e-Government at the County Government of Uasin Gishu
Dr. Albert Kimutai, a microbiologist, entrepreneur in [Eldoret], politician, educationist currently a senior lecturer of Microbiology at Kabianga University,
Moses Kiptanui, a runner and the first man to run a sub-eight time in the 3000m steeplechase race.
Kipchumba Murkomen, Senator Elgeyo Marakwet County
Alex Tolgos, 1st Elgeyo Marakwet County governor

References

Marakwet of Kenya by Dr. Benjamin Edgar Kipkorir / F.W. Welbourn published in 1973 by the East African Literature Bureau.
'The Expansion of Marakwet Hill-Furrow Irrigation in the Kerio Valley of Kenya' by W. Östberg. In Widgren, M. and Sutton, J.E.G. (eds.): Islands of Intensive Agriculture in Eastern Africa. James Currey publishers, Oxford, 2004 : 19-48.
"Oral Literature of the Marakwet of Kenya" by Paul Kipchumba. Kipchumba Foundation, Nairobi, 2016.
"Aspects of Indigenous Religion among the Marakwet of Kenya" by Kipchumba Foundation. Nairobi, 2017.

External links
Kalenjin Online - Marakwet

Kalenjin